The SFCA Lignel 20 was a French, single engine, low wing monoplane, one of a series of this type built by SFCA in the 1930s. It was capable of aerobatics but was primarily a racing aircraft.

Design and development

Jean Lignel's early designs with SFCA were developments of André Maillet's 1933 low wing Maillet-Nening MN-A. The Lignel 20, his first design under his own name, had a good deal in common with the SFCA Maillet 20 though it was a smaller aircraft seating one or two rather than the Maillet 20's three and had a more powerful engine. It was derived from the design of the SFCA Lignel 10 single seat fighter trainer, which did not fly until February 1938. By then the Lignel 20 had already flown.

The Lignel 20 was a low wing cantilever monoplane of entirely wooden construction apart from its engine mounting. The wing had a rectangular centre section with tapered outer panels, the latter with dihedral, which gave the wing an approximately elliptical plan. It was plywood skinned, with an external fabric covering.  There were split flaps on the inboard trailing edges and ailerons outboard.

The fuselage and empennage was built in a similar way. Behind the engine, the fuselage had an oval section. The  cockpit was behind the wing trailing edge; though primarily a single seat aircraft a passenger could be accommodated. The cockpit glazing was faired smoothly into a raised rear fuselage.

Its straight-edged, round-topped fin carried a curved-edged unbalanced rudder which reached down to the keel. It worked in a small cut-out in the straight-tapered elevators, mounted on a triangular tailplane positioned mid-high on the fuselage; the tailplane incidence could be adjusted on the ground.

The Lignel 20 had retractable landing gear with mainwheeels on forked cantilever legs from the outer edges of the centre section, swinging outwards into wing recesses. There were covers attached to the inner side of the forks, acting as aircraft fairings when retraction was complete.

The Lignel 20 first flew on 15 April 1937. Two were built. It was redesignated the SFFCA Lignel 20S and first flew in November 1937. It was announced at the 1938 Paris Salon that the Lignel 20S was currently being fitted with a supercharged, eight cylinder Régnier engine producing  
Louis Céments was test flying it from SFCA's airfield at Buc in March 1939.

Operational history

After Caudron, the only other manufacturer with entries, pulled out, SFCA decided a competition with only a single aircraft in it was pointless and the Coupe Deutsch was cancelled for that year.

Variants
Lignel 20 Original  Renault 6Q-03 engine, two built.

Specifications

References

SFCA aircraft
1930s French sport aircraft
Single-engined tractor aircraft
Low-wing aircraft
Aircraft first flown in 1937